Iğdır is a Turkic place name and may refer to the following places in Turkey:

 Iğdır Province, a province in eastern Turkey
 Iğdır, the capital city of the province
 Iğdır University, a university in the city
 Iğdır Airport, a public airport in the province
 Iğdır, Bayburt, a village in Bayburt Province
 Iğdır, Cumayeri
 Iğdır, Mersin, a village in Mersin Province
 İğdir, Yeşilova
 İğdir, Kurşunlu
 İğdir, Yapraklı

See also
 Igdir, Iran (disambiguation)